Hugh Monroe (1798-1892) was a Canadian trapper, guide, and interpreter. He worked for Hudson's Bay Company, American Fur Company, and independently throughout his life. He traveled with the Piikani Nation and was known as "Rising Wolf," with Rising Wolf Mountain later named after him.

Biography 

Monroe was born on July 9, 1798 in Trois-Rivières, Quebec. His father, Hugh Monroe (spelled Munro at the time), was a captain in the British Army and his grandfather was Capt. John Munro, a prominent loyalist.  His mother, Angelique de la Roche, née Leroux, was the daughter of a royal family who was part of the French Emigration. 

He attended English school in Montreal before moving on to a priest's college for four years, learning to speak both English and French. He began hunting at an early age and later and developed an interest for the outdoors. He later worked for Hudson's Bay Company where he worked as an apprentice-clerk in uncharted areas of modern-day Alberta. During a trip to Fort Edmonton in 1814, he was offered a job to travel with the Piikani Nation to learn their language and customs. 

Monroe traveled with the Piikani Nation for two years and became a liaison between them and Hudson's. During his time with the Piikani, he became known as Makwi-poachsin ("Rising Wolf"). He worked with Hudson's until 1823 when he began working independently as a trapper and guide. From 1853-1854, Monroe served as a guide and interpreter for Governor Isaac Stevens who was the first to make a treaty with the Blackfoot Confederacy the following year in 1855.

For the next decade, Monroe and some of his family worked for the American Fur Company in Fort Benton, Montana. He worked as a trapper until the 1880s when he became too old to pursue the trade. He was reported to be living with two of his sons in 1890, somewhere along the Two Medicine River near Holy Family Mission.

Legacy 

Rising Wolf Mountain was named after Monroe. After his death, his close friend and author James Willard Schultz named the peak after Monroe. He was also referred to as the "White Blackfoot."

Personal life 
Monroe was married to Sinopah, a Blackfoot Confederacy woman, with whom he had 10 children. He died of old age on December 8, 1892. He is the grandfather of William Jackson for whom Jackson Glacier is named.

References 

1798 births
1892 deaths
Canadian hunters